Marko Matić (born 25 January 1988) is a Croatian handball player who plays for Maccabi Rishon LeZion.

References

1988 births
Living people
People from Ljubuški
Croats of Bosnia and Herzegovina
Croatian male handball players
Competitors at the 2013 Mediterranean Games
Mediterranean Games silver medalists for Croatia
Mediterranean Games medalists in handball